Mareya is a plant genus of the family Euphorbiaceae, first described as a genus in 1860. It is native to tropical western and central Africa.

Uses
Mareya micrantha is said to have local anaesthetic properties. It is also used as an abortifacient.

Species
 Mareya aristata Prain - Gabon
 Mareya brevipes Pax - Cameroon, Gabon, Congo-Brazzaville, Equatorial Guinea, Zaïre, Central African Republic, Uganda 
 Mareya congolensis (J.Léonard) J.Léonard - Zaïre
 Mareya micrantha (Benth.) Müll.Arg. (syn M. spicata) - widespread from Liberia to Zaire

formerly included
transferred to Mareyopsis 
Mareya longifolia Pax - Mareyopsis longifolia (Pax) Pax & K.Hoffm.

References

Acalypheae
Flora of Africa
Medicinal plants of Africa
Euphorbiaceae genera
Taxa named by Henri Ernest Baillon